Charles Robert Petrie (1882 – 6 October 1958) was a New Zealand politician of the Labour Party.

Biography

Petrie was born in Glasgow, Scotland and arrived in New Zealand in 1911. He was an active Presbyterian.

A shopkeeper in Otahuhu, he was first elected to the Otahuhu Borough Council in 1924, and served as mayor between 1935 and 1944.

Petrie unsuccessfully contested the Hauraki electorate in the  against Walter William Massey of the Reform Party. He represented the Hauraki electorate from 1935 to 1938, then the Otahuhu electorate from 1938 to 1949, when he retired. He died in 1958 and was buried at Otahuhu Cemetery.

Petrie was the sole Labour Member of Parliament to represent the Hauraki electorate in its history.

Notes

References

1882 births
1958 deaths
New Zealand Labour Party MPs
Scottish emigrants to New Zealand
Mayors of places in the Auckland Region
Members of the New Zealand House of Representatives
New Zealand MPs for Auckland electorates
New Zealand MPs for North Island electorates
Burials at Otahuhu Cemetery
Politicians from Glasgow
New Zealand Presbyterians
Unsuccessful candidates in the 1931 New Zealand general election